The Armenian Soviet Encyclopedia (Haykakan sovetakan hanragitaran; ASE) publishing house was established in 1967 as a department of the Institute of History of the  Armenian Academy of Sciences under the presidency of Viktor Hambardzumyan (1908–1996), co-edited by Abel Simonyan (1922–1994) and Makich Arzumanyan (1919–1988). In 1988–1999 the editor-in-chief was Konstantin Khudaverdyan (1929–1999) and since 1999 Hovhannes Aivazyan. It produced the Soviet Armenian Encyclopedia (also rendered Armenian Soviet Encyclopedia  from 1974–1986.

The AE publishing house also edited a children's encyclopedia, Who is it? What is it? in 4 volumes (1984–87), the Russian-Armenian Polytechnical Dictionary (1988) and a Traveler's Encyclopedia (1990). Since Armenian independence (1991) publications include titles on topics of such current-day issues such as the first Nagorno-Karabakh War, the Armenian Question and the Armenian diaspora.

Creative Commons licensing
On 30 September 2011, the owner of "Armenian Encyclopedia" Publishing House SNCO and "School of Information Technologies" Foundation  signed a cooperation agreement, which allowed the content of a number of Armenian encyclopedias to be in open circulation on the basis of Creative Commons BY-SA 3.0 or higher licenses used in Wikimedia projects. The following encyclopedias are subject to this contract:

Armenian Soviet Encyclopedia, 13 volumes, ch. ed. 1974-1987
, 4 volumes, chapter editor, 1990-2003
Armenian Question, 1 volume, head of the Armenian Encyclopedia ed. 1996
Nature of Armenia, Armenian Encyclopedia ed. 2006
Who is who? Armenian biographical encyclopedia, 2 volumes, Armenian Encyclopedia ed. 2005-2007
Karabakh Liberation War 1988-1994 encyclopedia, Armenian Encyclopedia ed. 2004
Great School Encyclopedia, 4 volumes, Armenian Encyclopedia ed. 2008-2010
Armenian Diaspora Encyclopedia, 1 volume, Armenian Encyclopedia ed. 2003
Armenian Diaspora Encyclopedia 2003 (djvu, Wikisource)
Christian Armenia Encyclopedia, 1 volume, Chapter of the Armenian Encyclopedia. ed. 2002
Christian Armenia Encyclopedia 2002 (djvu, Wikisource)

Series

Soviet Armenian Encyclopedia
 
The first volume of the Soviet Armenian Encyclopedia (SAE) appeared in 1974, and the first edition in 13 volumes was complete by 1987. The SAE includes 38,767 articles, 15,263 images and 858 maps and over 100,000 copies have been printed.

See also
Great Soviet Encyclopedia

References

Notes 

Publishing companies established in 1967
Armenian literature
Book publishing companies
Armenian-language encyclopedias
Publishing companies of the Soviet Union
1967 establishments in Armenia
Armenian Soviet Socialist Republic
National Soviet encyclopedias
20th-century encyclopedias